Zeng Cheng (born 8 January 1987) is a Chinese footballer who currently plays for Shanghai Shenhua in the Chinese Super League.

Club career
Zeng Cheng started his football career at top tier side Wuhan Guanggu; however, he was soon loaned out to Indonesia Super League side Persebaya for more playing time at the beginning of the 2005 season. On his return to Wuhan, he would be allowed to make his league debut at the end of the league season on 5 November 2005 in a 1-1 draw against Shanghai Shenhua. For several seasons, Zeng would play understudy to Deng Xiaofei until Wuhan quit the league and were subsequently relegated in the 2008 season after the club's management did not accept the punishment given to them by the Chinese Football Association after a scuffle broke out during a league game against Beijing Guoan on 27 September 2008.

At the beginning of the 2009 season, Zeng transferred to another top tier side Henan Jianye where he established himself as the first-choice goalkeeper ahead of Zhou Yajun. The move turned out to be a big success and the club would finish in it highest ever position of third place in the league and qualify for the AFC Champions League for the first time in the club's history.

On 1 January 2013, along with Zhao Peng and Yi Teng, Zeng successfully transferred to two-time, back-to-back Chinese Super League champions Guangzhou Evergrande on a free transfer. During the 2013 season, Zeng established himself as Guangzhou's first-choice goalkeeper due to impressive displays which impressed manager Marcello Lippi. At the end of the season, Lippi credited Zeng as "one of Guangzhou's best buys." Zeng finished the 2013 season only conceding 16 goals and kept 13 clean sheets in 27 matches in the league. He was an important cog in what was considered absolute dominance by Guangzhou during the group and knockout stages of the AFC Champions League that season. On 9 November 2013, Zeng won the continental title with the club, winning the finals against FC Seoul in a two-legged tie which ended with them winning on away goals.

On 6 September 2016, Zeng suffered a rupture of posterior cruciate ligament in his left knee during a 2018 FIFA World Cup qualification match against Iran, ruling him out for the rest of the 2016 season. He played 23 league matches and kept 10 clean sheets in the 2016 season as he was awarded with the Chinese Football Association Goalkeeper of The Year award for the third time in November 2016.

International career
Zeng's performances for Henan Jianye at the beginning of the 2009 season would see the Chinese national team manager Gao Hongbo call him up to the international set-up for the first time. He made his debut against Iran in a friendly which China won 1-0 on 1 June 2009. After that game, he would become the national team's second choice goalkeeper behind Yang Zhi and be included in the squad that won the 2010 East Asian Football Championship before being included in the 2011 AFC Asian Cup squad.

Career statistics

Club statistics
.

International statistics

Honours

Club
Wuhan Guanggu
Chinese Super League Cup: 2005

Guangzhou Evergrande
Chinese Super League: 2013, 2014, 2015, 2016, 2017, 2019
AFC Champions League: 2013, 2015
Chinese FA Cup: 2016
Chinese FA Super Cup: 2016, 2017, 2018

International
China PR national football team
East Asian Football Championship: 2010

Individual
Chinese Football Association Goalkeeper of the Year: 2013, 2015, 2016
Chinese Super League Team of the Year: 2013, 2015, 2016

References

External links

Player stats at sohu.com
Squad profile at Henan Construction website

1987 births
Living people
Footballers from Wuhan
Association football goalkeepers
Chinese footballers
China international footballers
Chinese expatriate footballers
Wuhan Guanggu players
Persebaya Surabaya players
Chinese Super League players
Henan Songshan Longmen F.C. players
Guangzhou F.C. players
Shanghai Shenhua F.C. players
Expatriate footballers in Indonesia
Chinese expatriate sportspeople in Indonesia
2011 AFC Asian Cup players
2015 AFC Asian Cup players